Pandeli Sotir Majko (born 15 November 1967) is an Albanian socialist politician. He served twice as Prime Minister of Albania; once from 1998 to 1999, and again in 2002.

Political career

Early career
Majko has been a member of the Euro-Socialist Youth Forum of Albania (FRESH) since its foundation in 1992. FRESH is itself a member of the International Union of Socialist Youth. From 1992 to 1995, Majko served as President of FRESH. Former Prime Minister Ilir Meta was also a member of FRESH.

In 1992 he entered the Albanian Parliament as MP for the Socialist Party. In 1997–2001 he took part in the parliamentary committee charged with the task of drafting the new Constitution of Albania. In 1997–1998 Majko was secretary general of the Socialist Party and head of its parliamentary group.

Prime Minister

First term (1998–1999)
From September 1998 to October 1999 Majko held his first government as prime minister of Albania. He was the youngest Prime Minister of Albania, appointed when he was 30 years old in 1998 for the first time.

Second term (2002)
After the government of Ilir Meta, he briefly came back to premiership from February to July 2002. He subsequently held the post of Minister of Defence from July 2002 to September 2005 in the government of Fatos Nano. Following the government's defeat in the 2005 elections, he returned to his former position as secretary general of the Socialist Party.

Later career
In 2006, Majko came out in support of Montenegro's vote for independence from Serbia. He was quoted celebrating the reduction in Albania's shared border with Serbia.

He is member of the General Council of the Transnational Radical Party.

Personal life
Majko was born in Tirana, to a family originally from Gjirokastra. In March 2013, after voting in favor of changing the name of the Liqenas to "Pustec" through a Facebook status, he denied having Slavic roots and introduced the beginning of his family, which started with a German doctor who moved from Parga to Gjirokastra due to the occupation of Parga by Ali Pasha of Ioannina, where he later married a local woman and was nicknamed "Memeci" due to the lack of fluent communication in the Albanian language, a nickname that would later become a surname. But later, this surname was changed to Majko by Pandeli's great-grandfather due to the trade relations that the family had at that time.

On 8 February 2016, Majko in an interview confirmed that he has started the procedure to obtain a Kosovo passport, and after two months through a Facebook status he confirms that is officially a citizen of Kosovo.

See also 
 List of Albanians
 Politics of Albania

References

External links

|-

1967 births
Living people
Politicians from Tirana
Albanian people of German descent
German people of Albanian descent
People with acquired Kosovan citizenship
Naturalised citizens of Kosovo
21st-century Albanian politicians
Socialist Party of Albania politicians
Prime Ministers of Albania
Government ministers of Albania
Defence ministers of Albania